Huang Haibo is the name of:

Huang Haibo (TV host) (born 1965), Chinese TV host, journalist and assistant director of Phoenix Television
Huang Haibo (actor) (born 1975), Chinese actor